This is a list of video games developed or published (or both) by Big Blue Bubble.

References

Big Blue Bubble